The Shvetsov ASh-62 (Russian: АШ-62, designated M-62 before 1941) is a nine-cylinder, air-cooled, radial aircraft engine produced in the Soviet Union. A version of this engine is produced in Poland as the ASz-62 and the People's Republic of China as the HS-5.

Design and development
The ASh-62 was a development of the Wright R-1820 Cyclone that had been built in Russia under licence as the Shvetsov M-25, the main improvements including a two-speed supercharger and a more efficient induction system. Power was increased from the Cyclone's 775 hp to 1,000 hp. First run in 1937, licensed versions are still in production by WSK "PZL-Kalisz" in Poland (as of 2017). The Ash-62 was also produced in China.  It is estimated that 40,361 were produced in the USSR.

Polish-built ASz-62IR engines (Polish transcription of Russian name), by WSK "PZL-Kalisz" in Kalisz, are compatible with FAR-33 requirements. Further developments in Poland are the K9-AA, K9-BA and K9-BB engines, with take-off power of 1178 hp (860 kW), indicated power 698 kW. From 2015 the ASz-62IR-16E was produced with electronic fuel injection, offering greater power and the possibility of running on commercial automotive fuel.

The M-63 was an improved version of the M-62 with the power output increased to 821 kW (1,100 hp) at 2,300 rpm for takeoff and 671 kW (900 hp) at 2,200 rpm at  due to a higher compression ratio of 7.2:1 and a higher redline.

Applications
 Antonov An-2
 Antonov An-6
 Lisunov Li-2

 Kharkiv KhAI-5
 Polikarpov I-153
 Polikarpov I-16
 PZL-106 Kruk (some variants)
 PZL-Mielec M-18 Dromader
 PZL M-24 Dromader Super (K-9AA)
 Sukhoi Su-2 (prototype)
 Sukhoi Su-12
 VL Myrsky (one prototype)

Specifications (M-62)

See also

References

Notes

Bibliography

 
 Russian Aviation Museum
 Venik's Aviation

External links

Producer's page WSK "PZL-Kalisz"
asz-62ir.pl.tl
AN-2 Aircraft

1930s aircraft piston engines
Aircraft air-cooled radial piston engines
Shvetsov aircraft engines